Jirandeh (jirandeh) (Tati: , Jirindih) is a city and capital of Amarlu District, in Rudbar County, Gilan Province, Iran.

It is located north of the Shahrood river in the Alborz (Elburz) mountain range.

At the 2006 census, its population was 2,616, in 754 families. Its residents are Tat people and they speak the Tati language.

Etymology 
In the Tati language, Jirindih means the lower village:
Jirindih = Jirin (Lower) + Dih (village, land)

Places near Jirandeh
 Ainahdih
 Dosalan
 Askabon
 Lavarbon
 Mianah kushk

Rivers
 Rudxan

Tribes
 Tats

References

 Book of Amarlu - M.M. Zand

Cities in Gilan Province
Populated places in Rudbar County
Settled areas of Elburz